Countess Erzsébet Thurzó de Bethlenfalva (20 February 1621 – 4 July 1642) was a Hungarian noblewoman, daughter of Count Imre Thurzó and Baroness Krisztina Nyáry.

Marriage
Countess Erzsébet married to Count István Esterházy (1616–1641), son of Palatine Nikolaus, Count Esterházy and Baroness Orsolya Dersffy, on 26 September 1638 in Kismarton (today: Eisenstadt, Austria). Palatine Nikolaus (Miklós) was the second husband of Baroness Nyáry, Erzsébet's mother. Countess Erzsébet and Count István had a daughter:

 Orsolya (7 March 1641 – 31 March 1682), who married to her own uncle, Paul I, Prince Esterházy on 7 February 1655.

References

Sources
 Miklós Kubinyi: Bethlenfalvi gróf Thurzó Imre 1598–1621, Budapest, Méhner Vilmos kiadása, 1888.

1621 births
1642 deaths
Hungarian nobility
Hungarian Lutherans
Erzsebet